Justseeds Artists' Cooperative is a decentralized, worker-owned cooperative of thirty artists throughout North America. Justseeds members primarily produce handmade prints and publications which are distributed through their website and at conferences and events related to social and environmental movements. Members also work individually as graphic designers for and within a broad swath of social and environmental activist causes in the U.S., Canada, and Mexico. As a collective body, Justseeds has produced several gallery exhibitions of both print work and collaborative sculptural installation.

History
Justseeds was founded in 1998 by member Josh MacPhee as an internet-based store and distribution point for graphics that MacPhee, his friends, and associated groups were producing. Following the 2006 collapse of Clamor magazine, which was then handling Justseeds mail-order distribution, MacPhee sought to organize several artists with which he already had a working relationship into a cooperative entity that would expand to include other artists with equal stakes in the new project. Originally launched as Justseeds/Visual Resistance Collective in 2007, the name has since been shortened to Justseeds Artists’ Cooperative.

Justseeds ran a distribution center, consisting of their online store and an internal archive, from the basement of a private home in Portland, Oregon from 2007 until 2010. In May 2010, operations were moved to Pittsburgh, Pennsylvania.

Organization
Justseeds is a worker-owned, cooperatively structured business entity. However, the organization's internal structure is similar to many grassroots activist collectives in the U.S., with a concentration on consensus decision making. Although the business entity is registered in the state of Pennsylvania, where the shipping office for the internet store is located, active Justseeds members are spread across several locations within North America. Inter-cooperative communication happens primarily online, and mission-oriented discussions and project generation occur at occasional large group gatherings.

Justseeds is usually identified as a collective organization of graphic printmakers, however individual artists within the organization also work autonomously from the group as educators, writers, sculptors, designers, and in puppet theater. Individual members have published books, fanzines, and other graphic works which are informally included within the Justseeds rubric, including the journal Signal (Dunn, Macphee, PM Press) and the Celebrate People’s History Book (MacPhee, Feminist Press 2010). Firebrands: Portraits from the Americas (Microcosm Publishing, 2010) was their first collective publishing endeavor.

As of March 2020, the members of Justseeds are: Favianna Rodriguez, Josh MacPhee, Meredith Stern, Melanie Cervantes, Jesus Barraza, Dylan Miner, Nicolas Lampert, Jess X. Snow, Mary Tremonte, Thea Gahr, Roger Peet, Alec "Icky" Dunn, Pete Yahnke Railand, Shaun Slifer, Bec Young, Chris Stain, Colin Matthes, Molly Fair, Fernando Mati, Jesse Purcell, Chip Thomas, Kevin Caplicki, Kristine Virsis, Lesly Geovanni Mendoza, Mazatl, Sanya Hyand, Paul Kjelland, Aaron Hughes, and Erik Ruin.

Much of Justseeds work is republished in newspapers and on websites following informal anti-copyright ethics. Justseeds members commonly respond to current social movements by producing free graphics for download and use from their website and blog.

Collective projects
Justseeds has collectively produced several print portfolios and collaborative art installations which differ from the individual members’ projects in that they are considered productions of Justseeds as a collective entity. In the case of the print portfolios, Justseeds regularly works with other outside, affiliated artists.

 Voices From Outside: Artists Against the Prison Industrial Complex (with Critical Resistance, print portfolio, 2008)
 In the Shell of the Old (collaborative installation, Space 1026, Philadelphia, PA, 2008)
 Which Side Are You On? (collaborative installation, University of Wisconsin, Milwaukee, 2009)
 Resourced (print portfolio, 2009)
 Firebrands: Portraits from the Americas (book, Microcosm Publishing, 2010)
 untitled billboard landscape (collaborative installation, Miller Gallery at Carnegie Mellon University, 2011 Pittsburgh Biennial, Pittsburgh, PA)
 Refuge (collaborative installation, 29th Biennial of Graphic Arts, Alkatraz Gallery: Metelkova, Ljubljana, Slovenia, 2011)
 War is Trauma (with Iraq Veterans Against the War, print portfolio, 2011)
 Migration Now (collaboration with CultureStrike, print portfolio, 2013)
 Uprisings: Images of Labor (collaborative installation, University of Wisconsin, Milwaukee, 2013)
 Liberating Learning (print portfolio, 2014)
 We Are The Storm (collaboration with CultureStrike, print portfolio, 2015)
 We're All in this Together (collaborative installation with Interference Archive, SUNY Purchase, Fall 2017)

Affiliated organizations
There are several organizations with which Justseeds is directly affiliated by the presence of overlapping members:
 Colectivo Cordyceps (Mexico)
 Dignidad Rebelde (Oakland, CA, USA)
 Taller Tupac Amaru (Oakland, CA, USA)
 Interference Archive (New York, NY, USA)
 Street Art Workers (USA)
 Howling Mob Society (Pittsburgh, USA)
 Visual Resistance (New York, NY, USA)
 Spectres of Liberty (Troy, NY, USA)

References

Justseeds: About
 Mallory Gevaert, Zine Scene: Firebrands, Alarm Press, September 1, 2010
 Lawrence, Interviews - Justseeds, Arrested Motion, May 4, 2010
 Bonnie Fortune, Justseeds: Art, Activism, and Functional Group Blogging, HASTAC, November 18, 2009
 Daniel Tucker, Justseeds: Reminders of Emancipation and Justice, Alarm Press, July 28, 2008
 Melanie Maddison, Women of Justseeds, Aorta Magazine (pub. date unknown, retrieved 2012-02-12)

Further reading

External links
Justseeds Artists' Cooperative
RESOURCED

American artist groups and collectives
Artist cooperatives